Muhamad Aqmal Hakeem bin Abdul Hamid (born 14 November 1990) is a Bruneian footballer who plays for Indera SC of the Brunei Super League as a midfielder or forward. He has won two league championships with Indera and previously QAF FC. He also made three appearances for the Brunei national football team in 2009.

Club career

Aqmal was one of the first students who enrolled for Brunei's Sports School when it first opened in 2003. He first played for AH United after he graduated. Then he joined defending league champions QAF FC for the 2009–10 Brunei Premier League, scoring three times and contributing to QAF's third straight league title. He joined Indera SC in 2011 and stayed there until early 2014, winning the inaugural Brunei Super League in the 2012–13 season.

After a four-year hiatus, Aqmal returned to the pitch for Indera at the start of the 2018 Brunei Super League.

International career

As a member of QAF FC, Aqmal had the opportunity to represent the Brunei national football team at the 2010 AFC Challenge Cup qualification matches held in Sri Lanka in April 2009. He played in all of the three matches against Sri Lanka, Pakistan and Chinese Taipei, losing each time.

Three years later, Aqmal was a squad member of the Brunei under-21 side that won the 2012 Hassanal Bolkiah Trophy, appearing once against Timor-Leste.

Aqmal represented Brunei at the 27th SEA Games hosted by Myanmar in December the following year. He played in all four group matches in a disappointing campaign for the Young Wasps, finishing with zero points.

Honours

Team
QAF FC
Brunei Premier League: 2009–10
Indera SC
Brunei Super League: 2012–13
Brunei U21
Hassanal Bolkiah Trophy: 2012

Individual
 
  Meritorius Service Medal (PJK) (2012)

References

External links

1990 births
Living people
Association football midfielders
Bruneian footballers
Brunei international footballers
Indera SC players
Competitors at the 2013 Southeast Asian Games
Southeast Asian Games competitors for Brunei